Metro is a free weekly newspaper published by the San Jose, California, based Metro Newspapers. Also known as Metro Silicon Valley, as well as Metroactive online, the paper serves the greater Silicon Valley area. In addition to print form, Metro can be downloaded in PDF format for free from the publisher's website. Metro also keeps tabs on local politics and the "chattering" class of San Jose through its weekly column, The Fly.

The newspaper has been published since 1985 and is one of the remaining owner-operated publications in the alternative press. Its principal distribution area encompasses the cities of San Jose, Los Gatos, Campbell, Saratoga, Santa Clara, Sunnyvale, Cupertino, Milpitas, Mountain View, Los Altos and Palo Alto.

Entertainment and investigative journalism
Metro is largely read for its coverage of the San Jose region's culture and entertainment scene. It publishes an exhaustive arts section, which includes calendar listings, music reviews, critical coverage of the performing and visual arts, as well as movie reviews and information. The newspaper has employed well-regarded film critic Richard von Busack since 1985. Steve Palopoli edited the publication from March 2005 until December 2008 and currently edits Good Times.

In 1986, Metro published the last interview with Don Hoefler, the man credited with naming Silicon Valley. Metro has scooped the daily press on a number of major stories, including the office romance of San Jose Mayor Ron Gonzales in 2000 and the Santa Clara County Grand Jury's plans to indict Gonzales in June 2006.

In 1996, Metro's “Public Eye” column scooped Apple's December 20 announcement of a deal between Steve Jobs’ NeXT Inc. and Apple Inc. that led to Jobs’ return to Apple.

In 2007, Metro and its sister publication North Bay Bohemian prompted Sen. Dianne Feinstein’s resignation from the U.S. Senate's Military Construction Appropriations subcommittee after the two papers published an exposé by Peter Byrne documenting Feinstein's conflicts of interest related to husband Richard C. Blum's ownership interest in two major defense contractors, firms that received billions of dollars in contracts for military construction projects that were approved during Feinstein's tenure on the subcommittee.

In 2012, Metro published a series of articles on Santa Clara County Board of Supervisors chair George Shirakawa, Jr., who had failed to file legally required campaign disclosure statements and had not turned in receipts for 175 taxpayer-underwritten meal charges. The disclosures resulted in an investigation by the Fair Political Practices Commission and the Santa Clara County District Attorney's office. Shirakawa pleaded guilty on March 1, 2013 to five felonies and seven misdemeanors and resigned his office. Assistant District Attorney Karyn Sinunu Towery credited Metro’s reports with prompting the criminal investigation at the press conference announcing the plea and resignation. The House Committee on Ethics investigated Rep. Mike Honda following revelations in Metro that contributors were receiving favors from the congressman's office.

Notable alumni
The newspaper has helped launch the careers of several notable writers, including British television journalist Louis Theroux, author Jonathan Vankin, author and educator Gordon Young (Journalist), Vietnamese-American author Andrew Pham, Obama administration education advisor Hal Plotkin, News Director of Vice News Michael Learmonth, and film producer Zack Stentz  It also published the writings of Michelle Goldberg, six-word memoirist Larry Smith and Dave Eggers before they became published authors. It was also one of the first newspapers to publish Matt Groening's Life in Hell long before he created The Simpsons.

Community involvement

In 1986, Metro executive editor Dan Pulcrano co-founded with Ray Rodriguez the San Jose Downtown Association  and led the effort to start Music in the Park, a free public music festival that lasted until 2011 and staged performances by such groups as Neon Trees, Camper, Billy Preston, the BoDeans, Tower of Power and the Tubes.

The San Jose Jazz Society was started by Metro jazz writer Sammy Cohen and headquartered in Metro's office. The outgrowth was the annual San Jose Jazz Festival.

During the 1990s, Metro purchased community newspapers from companies such as the Tribune Company and established Silicon Valley Community Newspapers, which it sold in 2001.

Metro was the first to call for a Sunshine Ordinance during the 1998 mayor's race. An ordinance was passed in 2009.

In explaining the newspaper's mission on its 20th anniversary, executive editor Pulcrano said, “We have championed independent businesses and small theaters in an effort to help the valley establish its own cultural identity. We have pushed for preservation of historic buildings and agricultural lands that represent the valley’s heritage and soul. And we have promoted sensible, pedestrian-oriented development that gets people out of their cars so they can get to know one another. A newspaper at its best should be a community-builder.” 

In 2012, Metro sponsored the Silicon Valley Sound Experience, a multi-venue music festival, which led to the establishment of Creative Convergence Silicon Valley, or C2SV, the following year. The 2013 event included performances by Iggy and The Stooges and a three-day technology conference with appearances by Steve Wozniak, Nolan Bushnell and John McAfee. The 2015 C2SV brought camera phone inventor Philippe Kahn and Oculus VR co-inventor Jack McCauley  to the stage of the California Theatre.

Awards
Metro has received several awards for its work, including:
 Three papers in the Metro Newspapers group won at the National Newspaper Association's 1995 contest, announced September 1996.
 Metro won two awards, for editorial cartooning and writing, at the California Newspaper Publishers Association Better Newspapers Awards, July 1996
 Six papers in the Metro Newspapers group were honored for writing, editing and design at the California Newspaper Publishers Association Better Newspapers Awards, July 1997.
 Metro staff writer J. Douglas Allen-Taylor received first place in the Peninsula Press Club's 1997 Professional Journalism Awards Competition for specialty story detailing how the malt liquor industry, after achieving success marketing to black communities, set its sights on the Latino youth market.
 Metro staff writer Will Harper received an honorable mention in the Peninsula Press Club's 1997 Professional Journalism Awards Competition for feature story, weeklies ("The New Jesus").
 Metro Special Sections Editor Gordon Young received First Place in the Peninsula Press Club's 1994 Professional Journalism Awards Competition for light feature story, weeklies ("Pop Culture Princess").
 Metro Silicon Valley won two awards, in lifestyle coverage and freedom of information, at the California Newspaper Publishers Association Better Newspapers Awards, July 2004.
 Metro Silicon Valley won two awards at the California Newspaper Publishers Association Better Newspapers Awards, October 2008.
 Metro Silicon Valley’s Nick Veronin won SPJ NorCal Excellence in Journalism Award: Arts & Culture at the Society of Professional Journalists, NorCal Chapter in October 2016 for his “Radius Clause” feature, which revealed how the music industry's anticompetitive practices put a damper on Silicon Valley nightlife.
 Metro Freelancer John Flynn won a Society of Professional Journalists Norcal award for “Lost in Translation,” an investigation into the scarcity of interpreters in Santa Clara County's justice system and how that shortage impacts the rights of non-English speakers.

Early online player
Metro was an early participant in the online publishing revolution, launching the Livewire online service in 1993, one of the first online efforts by a non-daily newspaper publisher. The service offered free email accounts, online commerce, chats, posting forums and online articles.

Virtual Valley, a similar service with an emphasis on covering Silicon Valley communities, was launched the following year and helped put the city governments of San Jose, Milpitas and Los Gatos online. Also in 1994, Metro established Boulevards, a network of city guides that pre-dated Citysearch and Microsoft's short-lived "Sidewalk" service.

In 1995, Metro launched the online version of the newspaper under the brand Metroactive.

References

External links
 About Metro Newspapers (official site)
 Metroactive web site
 Metro Silicon Valley
 SV411 Silicon Valley Newsblog
 Metro: PDF edition
 Metros "Boulevards" city site, SanJose.com
 San Jose Inside

Newspapers published in San Jose, California
Alternative weekly newspapers published in the United States
Publications established in 1985
1985 establishments in California
Weekly newspapers published in California